Løgismose Meyers is a food company based in Copenhagen, Denmark. It produces and purveys a wide range of food products under the Løgismose and Meyers brands and is also active in the market for foodservice. It owns the chains Meyers Bageri (Meyer's Bakery), Meyers Diner and Meyers Madhus.

History
The company was established by IK Investment Partners after it had acquired Løgismose from the Grønløkke family as well as most of Claus Meyer's culinary activities. Tørk Eskild Furhauge succeeded Steen Halbye as CEO in September 2016.

Activities

Løgismose has a strategic partnership with Dansk Supermarked and Meyers has a strategic partnership with Coop Danmark.

Meyers Contract Catering is the operator of canteens, restaurants, cafés and bars. Meyers Køkken caters for companies and private customers. Meyers Bageri is a chain of organic bakeries in Copenhagen. Meyers Deli operates two sites.

References

External links
 

Food and drink companies of Denmark
Food and drink companies based in Copenhagen
Danish companies established in 2015
Companies based in Copenhagen Municipality